Hypsochila is a Neotropical genus of butterflies in the family Pieridae.

Species
Hypsochila argyrodice (Staudinger, 1899)
Hypsochila galactodice Ureta, 1955
Hypsochila huemul Peña, 1964
Hypsochila microdice (Blanchard, 1852)
Hypsochila penai Ureta, 1955
Hypsochila wagenknechti (Ureta, 1938)

References

Pierini
Pieridae of South America
Pieridae genera